1968 presidential election may refer to:

 1968 Cypriot presidential election
 May 1968 Dahomeyan presidential election
 July 1968 Dahomeyan presidential election
 1968 Finnish presidential election
 1968 Icelandic presidential election
 1968 Israeli presidential election
 1968 Maldivian presidential election
 1968 United States presidential election
 1968 Venezuelan presidential election